Marin Draganja and Mate Pavić were the defending champions, but they decided not to participate this year.

Sergey Betov and Mikhail Elgin won the title, defeating Chen Ti and Ruan Roelofse in the final, 6–4, 6–7(2–7), [10–7].

Seeds

Draw

References
 Main Draw

Eskisehir Cup - Doubles
2015 Doubles